Alligator wrestling is an attraction, that later evolved into a sport, that began as  hunting expeditions by Native Americans. It has been described as "alligator capturing techniques."

Native American historical origins
Southeastern Native Americans hunted alligators as a food source for thousands of years. At the turn of the 20th century, showing off alligators as roadside attractions helped Native Americans generate revenue. Long before the first Europeans explorers wandered into the Florida Everglades, alligator wrestling existed. For tribes like the Seminole and Miccosukee, learning how to "handle" the reptiles was part of their existence.

In Florida

A common symbol of Florida in popular culture is the American alligator (Alligator mississippiensis). The St. Augustine Alligator Farm was one of Florida's earliest themed tourist attractions that opened for business in 1893. At the St. Augustine Alligator Farm and other tourist attractions such as Gatorland and the Silver Springs Nature Park, "taming" or hypnotizing alligators was a popular trick, along with other performances such as alligator wrestling. Alligator wrestling is a common spectator activity for people to do in Florida and is most common near the Everglades' so-called Alligator Alley.

See also
 American alligator
 List of fatal alligator attacks in the United States
 Miccosukee
 Seminole
 Camel wrestling

References

Alligators and humans
Animals in sport
Native American sports and games
Seminole culture
Animal combat sports
Wrestling